Juro may refer to:
 Juro Novelty Company, American toy manufacturer

People with the name 
 Juro Adlešič (1884–1968), Slovenian lawyer and politician
 Jūrō Gotō (1887–1984), Japanese military officer
 Juro Janosik (1688–1713), Slovak highwayman
 Jūrō Kara (born 1940), Japanese playwright and actor
 Juro Kuvicek (born 1967), Norwegian footballer
 Jūrō Oka (1870–1923), Japanese businessman
 Juro Tkalčić (1877–1957), Croatian musician
 Kagami Jūrō (1836-1876), Japanese samurai

See also 
 Juru (disambiguation)

Japanese masculine given names